The Southwest Recreation Center, is one of three athletic facilities at the University of Florida with services available to students, alumni, and faculty members. The facility had a major expansion in 2010 that includes an expanded cardiovascular room and an indoor track.

Facilities include
A  strength and conditioning room
Six indoor basketball courts
Five indoor racquetball courts
A multipurpose gymnasium for indoor soccer, handball, and basketball
A  split-level room with cardiovascular equipment
Two Massage Therapy rooms
Personal Training studio 
Fitness Assessment Center (FAC)
Athletic Training room
Three Activity rooms
Men’s and Women’s locker rooms with digital locks
Day lockers
Social lounge

See also
University of Florida
Buildings at the University of Florida

External links 
 
 Info from the Student Union website
 Dean's Office talks about Southwest
 Alligator talks about the expansion
 Additional info from the Alligator
 Gainesville Sun references the Rec Center

Buildings at the University of Florida
Category:University and college student recreation centers in the United States
1994 establishments in Florida
School buildings completed in 1994